BJJ may refer to:

 Brazilian jiu-jitsu, a sport and martial art
 Beth Jacob Jerusalem, a seminary (religious training college)
 Kannauji language of Uttar Pradesh, India (ISO code: bjj)
 Wayne County Airport (Ohio), United States